Vladimir Nikolaevich Platonov (born 28 July 1941, Kiev, Ukrainian SSR) is a Soviet and Ukrainian scientist in the field of sports science.

Early life and career

Platonov graduated from the Kiev State Institute of Physical Culture (KSIPC) in 1962. He then did postgraduate study at KSIPC and received a Doctor of Science in Pedagogy in 1979.

From 1969 to 1975, Platonov worked as a Senior Lecturer and then as an assistant professor at the Kyiv Institute of National Economy and concurrently the senior fellow of the fundamental research laboratory of high training loads at KGIFK. He was head of the department of swimming at KSIPC (1975–1977), Vice-Rector for scientific research (1977–1986), Head of the Department of theory of sports at KSIPC established by him (1984–1990), Head of the Department of Olympic and professional sports at KSIPC (1992–2000), Head of the Department of theory and methodology of sports preparation and reserve capacities of athletes at NUPESU (2003–2005); Rector of KSIPC, SUPES, and NUPESU (1986–2012); Adviser to the Rector of NUPESU, Professor of the Department of history and theory of the Olympic sport, and has been Editor-in-Chief of International scientific-theoretical journal Science in Olympic sport since 2012.

Awards and honours

Awards of the USSR
 Order of the Badge of Honour (1982)
 Medal "For Labour Valour" (1988)
 Medal "For many years of conscientious work" (1990)

Awards of Ukraine
 Merited Worker of Science and Technology of Ukraine (1990)
 Order of Merit, 3rd class (1997)
 Laureate of the State Prize of Ukraine in the field of Science and Technologies (1999)
 Honorable diploma of the Verkhovna Rada of Ukraine (2005)
 Order of Prince Yaroslav the Wise V grade (2006)
 Order of Merit, 2nd class (2009)

Awards from other countries
 Order of the Polar Star (Mongolia, 2011)

Other awards
 Laureate of the State Sports Committee of the USSR award "For the best research work in the field of physical culture and sports" (twice, in 1981 and 1987)
 Olympic order of the International Olympic Committee (2001)
 Award of the Ukrainian Academy of Sciences (2003)
 Gold medal of the International personnel Academy "For merits in education" (2003)
 Order "For merits", 1st class of the Ukrainian Academy of Sciences (2011)
 Laureate of the NOC of Ukraine award "For the best scientific book of the year" (thrice, in 2006, 2011, and 2013)
 Order of the National Olympic Committee of Kazakhstan
 Olympic order of the National Olympic Committee of Armenia (2015)
 Honorary President of the International Association of Physical Education and Sport Universities
 Honorary Doctor of leading higher educational institutions of physical education and sport of Azerbaijan, Bulgaria, China, Kazakhstan, Moldova, Mongolia, Poland, Romania, Russia, Tajikistan, Ukraine, Uzbekistan, and Venezuela.

References

External links
 Website

1941 births
Living people
National University of Ukraine on Physical Education and Sport
Soviet scientists
Ukrainian scientists
Laureates of the State Prize of Ukraine in Science and Technology
Sports scientists